Augustinus Hunnaeus (1521 – 1577 or 1578) was a Flemish Catholic theologian.

Life 
Hunnaeus was born in Mechelen in 1521. After attending school in his home city, Hunnaeus studied theology at University of Leuven, where he became Doctor of Philosophy. He taught Greek and Hebrew at the Gymnasium castrense of Leuven. He later became professor of theology at the local University.

Hunnaeus is one of the Syncretists of his time, whose work is based on Aristotle and Petrus Hispanus.
He contributed to the Plantin Polyglot, a polyglot Bible printed by Christopher Plantin in Antwerp.

Works 
 De disputatione inter disceptantes, dialectice instituenda, libellus. Praeterea fundamentum logices, 1551
 Avgvstini Hvnaei Dialectica Sev, Generalia Logices praecepta omnia, quaecunq[ue] praecipuè ex toto Aristotelis organo, ad ediscendum proponi consueuerunt: Priùs quidem iuxta ueterem translationem impressa, nunc uerò ad Ioachimi Perionij & Nicolai Grouchij uersionem accomodata ..., 1552
 Ordo ac series quinque nouorum indicum generalium diu multum que hactenus a studiosis desideratorum et nunc magna accesione in singulis suis partibus locupletatorum, 1582

References 

Roman Catholic theologians of the Habsburg Netherlands